John Wesley Gibbs (August 26, 1915 – April 22, 1982) was an American professional basketball player. He played for the Flint Dow A.C.'s in the National Basketball League (NBL) in two games during 1947–48.

He was the younger brother of NBL player Jim Gibbs.

References

1915 births
1982 deaths
American men's basketball players
Basketball players from Missouri
Central Missouri Mules basketball players
Flint Dow A.C.'s players
Guards (basketball)
High school basketball coaches in the United States
Oklahoma State Cowboys basketball players
People from Wayne County, Missouri
Professional Basketball League of America players